The Niederburg ("Lower Castle") at Kobern, also called the Niedernburg, Unterburg or Neue Burg, is a hill castle above the municipality of Kobern-Gondorf in the county of Mayen-Koblenz in the German state of Rhineland-Palatinate.

Location 

The ruins of the Niederburg stand at a height of about 150 metres above the village of Kobern on a hill ridge that points towards the Moselle. On the same ridge and about 50 metres higher, is the Oberburg ("Upper Castle") and St. Matthias' Chapel.

Description 

The castle has an amygdaloidal ground plan. It has a three-storey, 20-metre-high bergfried, measuring 7.5 x 8 metres, with an elevated entrance at a height of 10 metres. There are also the remains of a two-storey, Late Gothic palas. A wall tower and a cistern are also well preserved and there are significant portions of the outer walls. The castle was guarded to the west by a curtain wall with a zwinger and to the north by a throat ditch. The upper third of the bergfried and the battlements were rebuilt in the 19th century. Between 1976 and 1978, the state castle administration reconstructed and enhanced the palas and the cistern between the two towers.

History 
The castle was built in the mid-12th century. It is first recorded in 1195, when the then Burgherr made it a fiefdom of the Electorate of Trier. The female line of the lords of Isenburg-Kobern died out in the 13th century. The Kobern Castles and associated lordship passed via the heiress, Cecilia, to Frederick II of Neuerburg (a side line of the counts of Vianden). In 1309 the male line of this family also died out. Thereafter the castle and lordship was sold to the Archbishop of Trier. In 1688 the castle was destroyed.

Visiting 

The castle is open to the public all year round and may be visited free of charge.

Visitors may climb up to the castle on a footpath from the Mühlbach valley.

Monument protection 
The Niederburg is a protected cultural monument.

References

Literature 
 Ortsgemeinde Kobern-Gondorf (publ.): Kobern-Gondorf. 1980.
 Landesamt für Denkmalpflege - Burgen, Schlösser, Altertümer Rheinland-Pfalz (publ.), Führer der staatlichen Schlösserverwaltung des Landesamtes für Denkmalpflege Rheinland-Pfalz, Führungsheft 7,  Mainz, 1999

External links 

 

Castles in Rhineland-Palatinate
Kobern, Niederburg
Heritage sites in Rhineland-Palatinate
Kobern, Niederburg
+Niederburg Kobern
12th-century architecture